Yang Fudong ( born 1971 in Beijing) is a Chinese contemporary artist. In the early 1990s, he began to work with film. He began creating films and videos using 35 mm film. Currently Yang directs films, creates photographs, and creates video installations.

Yang is known to explore themes that are historical, social, and political by juxtaposing contradictions between current social issues, with cultural norms. A fan of the abstract and fragmented storyline, he tends to create sequences that are long and suspended, with the use of black-and-white as a constant.
Yang's work has a nostalgic feel that incorporates the lyrical harmony of traditional handscrolls with the expressiveness of new wave cinema that is reminiscent of Jim Jarmusch, someone he admires.

 Yang Fudong's most popular works include: Seven Intellectuals in a Bamboo Forrest, The Fifth Night, the 17th Biennale of Sydney, East of Que Village, An Estranged Paradise, Backyard- Hey! Sun is Rising, and No Snow on the Broken Bridge.

His work has been exhibited in China through avant-garde exhibitions in the late 1990s and has been consequently shown in many countries including solo presentations in Parasol Unit, London (2011); National Museum of Contemporary Art, Athens (2010); Asia Society, New York (2009); Kunsthalle Wien, Vienna (2005); Castello di Rivoli, Torino (2005); and the Renaissance Society, Chicago (2004). In 2013, Kunsthalle Zurich and Berkeley Art Museum & Pacific Film Archive co-organized his first retrospective exhibition. Recent exhibitions include Yang Fudong at the Wolverhampton Art Gallery, UK; Moving Mountains, OCAT Xi'an, China (both 2017) and Filmscapes, at ACMI, Melbourne (Australian Centre for the Moving Image) which traveled to the Auckland Art Gallery Toi o Tamaki, New Zealand (2015-2016). Yang Fudong has participated in prestigious international art events including the Sharjah Biennial, UAE (2013); Venice Biennale, Italy (2003 and 2007); The Asia Pacific Triennial of Contemporary Art, Australia (2006); Documenta XI, Germany (2002). He is represented by and regularly exhibits his work at Chinese contemporary art gallery ShanghART Gallery.

Education
Yang graduated in oil painting from China Academy of Fine Arts in Hangzhou in 1995.

Works

East of Que Village
East of Que Village is a six-channel film with black and white color. It shows a wild pack of dogs looking to scavenge in a small northern Chinese town on the outskirts of Beijing. This small rural town seems to bring up memories of Yang's own childhood and his hometown. The town is empty and basically evacuated. Yang Fudong is trying to show how contemporary China has moved away from its traditions and from a certain part of life. Yang shows the dogs struggling to find food until they turn against each other just for survival. There is a small group of people the dogs come across which immediately makes the viewer feel the humans must also be struggling to survive in the same way the dogs are. Yang Fudong shows a strong question of whether or not the contemporary movement in China is helping the country or making them weaker. He relates this film to his own personal life as well as his own experiences. It shows the isolation and emptiness every human feels at one point in their life. This film has a couple of messages in it but it does not overload the viewer. Yang Fudong gives one overall message to the audience to create an experience from which they can grow. The whole experience is important. There are six screens all playing at the same time with different film going on them. The whole viewing area is overwhelmed with the sounds of barking and the sounds of people (from the film). Yang Fudong captures the audience with his interesting work and his simply conveyed themes.

No Snow on the Broken Bridge
This is one of Yang Fudong's more personal works. This is a black and white film that is viewed on many different screens just as East of Que Village. In this film, Yang describes the troubles and difficulties for young people face growing up in a world heading towards modernism. Yang Fudong is one of these young people who are trying to find their way in the modern world. They do not want to discard all tradition but they realize the fast-growing world is all around them. No Snow on the Broken Bridge shows the experiences and emotions that Yang Fudong feels towards this movement and it portrays how his generation fells. Yang Fudong shows the isolation and alienation young intellectuals feel is today's society. This film is another example of how he captures the feelings of a whole generation in his films.

The Fifth Night
This is another one of Yang's video installations. This is one of Yang Fudong's more recent films that has received many praises. It is a black and white film that sets in old Shanghai. It is presented to viewers through seven different large screen televisions, spanning a total of 21 meters wide. This magnificent set up provides the viewer a great experience and takes them back to the setting of the film. In this film, Yang experiments with a new style of film instead of using his highly successful traditional style. Yang Fudong calls this new style "multiple-views file." This new style shows actor's expressions as if they were not controlled. The seven different cameras allows for a view of every emotion every actor shows. The uncontrolled expressions present an overall experience for the viewer as if they are in the film themselves. This new type of camera work was highly successful and it opened the door for many of the other filmmakers. Yang Fudong presented the piece extraordinarily and furthered his reputation as one of the greatest Chinese filmmakers and creative artists.

Seven Intellectuals in a Bamboo Forest
The film Seven Intellectuals in a Bamboo Forest is based on the story of seven intellectual individuals who come from the Wei and Jin Dynasty. Yang Fudong provides the audience with the name of the seven intellectuals: Ruan Ji, Ji Kang, Shan Tao, Liu Ling, Ruan Yan, Xiang Xiu and Wang Rong. These seven intellectuals, five men and two women, were all either poets or writers during the Wei or Jin Dynasty. These seven individuals attempt to escape the pressures of the world and retreat to the bamboo forest together. They are all well dressed with suitcases. In the forest they gather to drink. These seven intellectuals become unruly, singing songs and playing instruments that were popular in these dynasties. Yang Fudong expressed these individuals expressing individuality from the rest of the world, as well as freedom from the pressures that pursued them in their lives. These individuals are widely known for their passion and talent in regard to writing and poetry. They lay naked on a rocky point on the Yellow Mountain (Anhui Providence). The seven intellectuals indulged in many things including; feasting on dried fish, drinking, and sexual activities. Yang Fudong makes these seven intellectuals look as if they are young and careless, one never would have guessed that these people are the smartest and most talented people of their generation. The group then decides to take up a mountainside for rice farming. These people work very hard plowing and planting seeds. They are no longer dressed in their fancy clothes, instead, they are barefoot and in rags. While rice farming the seven intellectuals become very close with nature. They meditate on their sense of alienation and learn to appreciate what they have. Eventually, they go back to city life which confuses them due to their previous experiences. Upon return to the city they are confused and have no real direction in life. Even though they are back in Shanghai, where they originated, they feel lost because of all the new skyscrapers and buildings.
This is one of Yang Fudong's most famous works. This film has been shown all around the world and has been appreciated by all of them. Fudong captures the regret that his own generation has because they follow their dreams, as these seven intellectuals did. Yang provides a simple message for a very long film so it could be appreciated by all audiences, Chinese or not. This is a timeless piece of art. It can be appreciated by this generation as well as future generations. Yang Fudong does not contaminate his film with subjects or vents that only one generation can understand; instead, he leaves most of it open to interpretation to each individual person.
"The films play simultaneously here, instead of succession as they did in Venice. I recommend watching Part I and Part V in their entirely, since these two sections best capture the conflicts and regrets of Yang's generation of Chinese dreamers. The other films, while imaginative and haunting, are better savored in small doses."-Barbara Pollack

The Light That I Feel
The film was created during the summer of 2014 at Sandhornøy in Norway together with local actors and dancers. He produced an outdoor, site-specific film installation for the beautiful and ever-changing landscape. "I think about how to tell a narrative by using not people speaking so much, but how the wind tells a narrative, or how trees tell a narrative", he says. Silence is an important part of his work, inspired by an Eastern tradition where meaning cannot be spoken but is understood by the heart. The films bring together the old and the new, ancient wisdom and landscapes, and the idea of the collective with the more rootless and doubting approach of the urban individual. To describe it he says, "It's a feeling of yesterday, but it's actually tomorrow." Yang Fudong shows a sensitive and responsive approach in his work; his films touch upon questions around identity connected to history and heritage and the existential challenges of contemporary life. His grand, slow and poetic cinematic language counters the natural scenery on the Arctic island in an extraordinary way.

Quotes About Yang Fudong
"Yang Fudong's work epitomises how the recent and rapid modernisation of China challenges traditional values and culture," Dr Sherman, Executive Director of SCAF (Sherman Contemporary Art Foundation), said. "He skillfully balances this dichotomy to create works endowed with classic beauty and timelessness. His works investigate the structure and formation of identity through myth, personal memory and lived experience."

Exhibitions

Current and upcoming shows
The Light That I Feel, SALT Sandhornøy Norway, Aug 29, 2014 - Sep 6 2015 
ALTROVE: Yang Fudong, Gagliano del Capo, Italy, July 26 - September 4, 2014
Yang Fudong's New Women, A Century of Chinese Cinema, TIFF Bell Lightbox, Toronto, June 7 to August 11
Shanghart Taopu, ShanghART Taopu, Shanghai, Jan 01, 2010 - Dec 31, 2012
Face, Minsheng Art Museum, Shanghai, Mar 10, 2012 - May 20, 2012
60-Minute Cinema, Chinese Arts Centre, Manchester, UK, Apr 27, 2012 - Jun 09, 2012
Yang Fudong - The Fifth Night, Vancouver Art Gallery, Vancouver, Canada, May 12, 2012 - Sep 03, 2012
Yang Fudong: Close to the Sea•The Revival of the Snake, ShanghART Beijing, May 12, 2012 - Jun 15, 2012
The First Kyiv International Biennial of Contemporary Art ARSENALE 2012, the Best of Times, the Worst of Times. Rebirth and Apocalypse in Contemporary Art., Mystetskyi Arsenal, Kyiv (Kiev), Ukraine, May 17, 2012 - Jul 31, 2012
ART HK 12-Hong Kong International Art Fair- Booth Nr. 3A09, Art Fairs Hong Kong Convention Center, Hong Kong, May 17, 2012 - May 20, 2012
 Yang Fudong: Filmscapes, Australian Centre for the Moving Image, Melbourne, Australia, Dec 4, 2014 - 15 Mar, 2015

Solo exhibitions
2014: ALTROVE: Yang Fudong, curated by M. Torrigiani and D. Quadrio, Gagliano del Capo, Italy
2011
The Distance of Reality, Yang Fudong's Solo Exhibition, Wifredo Lam Contemporary Art Center, Havaianas, Cuba.
Yang Fudong, Utopia and Reality, Espoo Museum of Modern Art, Tapiola, Finland.
Yang Fudong: No Snow on the Broken Bridge, Sherman Contemporary Art Foundation, Sydney, Australia.
2010
Yang Fudong: The General's Smile, Hara Museum of Contemporary Art, Tokyo, Japan.
Yang Fudong: Seven Intellectuals in a Bamboo Forest and Other Stories, National Museum of Contemporary Art, Athens, Greece.
Yang Fudong Solo Exhibition, Kino Kino, Sandnes, Norway.
2009
Yang Fudong, Museum of Contemporary Art, Denver, Colorado.
Yang Fudong: Seven Intellectuals in a Bamboo Forest, Asia Society, New York.
2008: No Snow on the Broken Bridge, Phoenix Art Museum, Phoenix, Arizona.

Group exhibitions
2012
The Best of Times, The Worst of Times. Rebirth and Apocalypse in Contemporary Art., The First Kyiv International Biennial of Contemporary Art ARSENALE 2012, Mystetskyi Arsenal, Kyiv (Kiev), Ukraine.
2011
Super Organism, Cafa Museum, Beijing.
Moving Image In China : 1988-2011, Minsheng Art Museum, Shanghai.
Invisibleness is Visibleness: International Contemporary Art Collection of a Salaryman—Daisuke Miyatsu, Expanded Cinema, MMOMA and CCC Garage, Moscow, Russia.
Dual Senses and Dynamic Views - Contemporary Art Exhibition across the Taiwan Straits of 2011, The National Art Museum of China, Beijing.
2010
China Power Station - part 4, Pinacoteca Agnelli, Torino, Italy.
Nature of China - 2010 Contemporary Art Documenta, the official opening exhibition of True Color Museum, True Color Museum, Suzhou.
Roundtrip: Beijing—New York Now, Selections from the Dumus Collection, UCCA, Beijing.
2009
China China China!!!, Sainsbury Centre for Visual Arts, University of East Anglia, Norwich, England.
China Urban, The Douglas F. Cooley Memorial Art Gallery, Reed College, Portland, Oregon.
2008: I Still Believe in Tomorrow: Contemporary Video From Asia, Museum of Fine Art, Houston, Texas.
2007
52nd International Art Exhibition of La Biennale di Venezia, Venice, Italy.
The Real Thing: Contemporary Art from China, Tate Liverpool, England.
Electrones Libres: A Selection of Works from the Lemaître Collection, Tabacalera Donosita, San Sebastian.

References

General references

External links
 ShangART Gallery
 Interview with Yang Fudong
 Vancouver Art Gallery
 ArtReview December 2014

1971 births
Living people
Artists from Beijing
Chinese video artists
Chinese contemporary artists
China Academy of Art alumni
Chinese photographers